Dolly Varden is an unincorporated community in Clark County, in the U.S. state of Ohio.

History
Dolly Varden was platted in 1872, and most likely was named after Dolly Varden, a character in the novel Barnaby Rudge by Charles Dickens.

References

Unincorporated communities in Clark County, Ohio
1872 establishments in Ohio
Unincorporated communities in Ohio